The Lower West Side is a neighborhood in Buffalo, New York.

Geography 
The Lower West Side is bounded on the north by Porter Avenue and the Upper West Side. On the east Allentown with its historic district which ends approximately at Plymouth Avenue.  To the south is Niagara Square and the West Village, while west is the Niagara River and Interstate 190.

The main streets which run through the Lower West Side are Niagara Street (N-S) and Virginia Street (E-W).  Part of the historic Frederick Law Olmsted Buffalo Parks & Parkway System is contained in the Lower West Side.  
 Porter Avenue
 Front Park
 Columbus Park (Formerly Prospect Park)

Although not an Olmsted Park, LaSalle Park is part of the Buffalo Parks System and is the largest park in the Lower West Side.

The Lower West Side was primarily a largely Italian-American neighborhood. In the last 50 years, the neighborhood has become a largely Hispanic area, although it has also received recent renovation and reinvestment from "urban pioneers" relocating in Buffalo.

Notable places 
Grover Cleveland High School
D'Youville College
Leonardo da Vinci High School
Waterfront Elementary School
D'Youville Porter Campus School

See also
Neighborhoods of Buffalo, New York

External links 

The Transformation of Buffalo's Lower West Side

Neighborhoods in Buffalo, New York